The acculturation gap is the changing set of values and culture between a child and parent or guardian. The gap is usually revealed after a family immigrates from one country to another and assimilates into a culture. After immigration, a child adapts into a new culture quickly. The child usually interacts with more people from the new culture than the culture of their parents. School attendance plays a significant role in the shift of values and attitudes.

The acculturation gap-distress hypothesis states that because the parent and child acculturate at different rates, the acculturation gap exists. Because the parents have spent more time embracing their own culture and heritage, it takes more time for them to acculturate. Acculturation occurs when a person adapts into a new culture and learns its language, values, and traditions. When children acculturate, they are less proud of their family and view their parents as controlling. The parents do not switch their views and ideologies in the same way. The gap in language, values, and traditions between the child and parent is linked to conflict between them.

Conflict 
The acculturation gap in language can cause conflict between members of an immigrant family. The parents use their native language more so than the primary language of their new environment. The child, depending on the age of the child during immigration, is more likely to assume the local primary language as their own.

If a child does not formally learn the language of their parents, conflict arises between the family because it becomes difficult for the parent and child to discuss topics in depth with one another. When parents have to rely on their child for translation, it reverses the child-parent relationship and can lead to complications.

Acculturation gap-distress hypothesis 
The acculturation gap causes distress among parents and their children. When parents acculturate at a slower rate than their children, it can result in the parent growing apart from the child and not feeling as connected as before. In addition, parents could prevent the child from participating in activities that are a part of the new culture, which could lead the child to want to acculturate even further. Studies found that the increased conflict leads to more tense families that do not bond as deeply as others. In addition, it is likely that these children act out behaviorally or academically.

One study with Mexican-American families found that intergenerational acculturation was unrelated to youth behavioral issues and family conflict disproving the acculturation gap-distress hypothesis. The study found that when the parent was more acculturated than the child, the child struggled with aggression and antisocial behavior. This study also found that when neither the parent or child was acculturated to the American or traditional culture, the child had a greater risk of conduct problems.

Cultural dissonance 
Immigrants sometimes face cultural dissonance when moving from one place to another. They may be confronted with prejudice from locals who feel their home has been infiltrated. This results in the immigrant feeling uncomfortable in the new environment which can potentially lead to conflict.

Studies have found that an immigrant child's exposure to discrimination and negative stereotypes while acculturating also can generate family conflict back at home due to the child's lost traditional cultural values.

East Asian-American study findings 
Multiple studies were conducted to evaluate the acculturation gap and whether or not it has detrimental effects. The studies ask children and parents about how they feel about their own acculturation and the acculturation of other family members. The studies then compare the gaps. Results from some studies showed that parents were more attached to their cultural heritage while other studies showed that the children were more attached than their parents. Based on this, the acculturation gap may not be as predicted.

Studies also reflect that many struggle with adjusting culturally. Studies exhibit links between cultural dissonance and depression in the case of Chinese-American children. Chinese-Canadian and Chinese-American children who do not know the Chinese language as well as they'd like show a link to depression. Higher conflict than normal is shown in Indian-American, Soviet-American, and Vietnamese-American families where the acculturation gap exists.

Researchers found that the acculturation gap between East Asian-American generations is negatively correlated with parent-youth relationships. This disconnection leads to different mental health problems among the youth.

Mexican-American study findings 
Studies were conducted in the American Southwest, where there are many children with Mexican ancestry, to see how these children's home and parental values clash with the values of their peers at school. Studies have shown that higher levels of acculturation correlate with delinquency—the existence of a gap can increase the likelihood of children participating in deviant behaviors.

Studies with Mexican-American youth and parents also reflect similar data that remains inconclusive. The study notes that in the American Southwest, Mexican culture is prevalent and the close proximity to Mexico may play a role in the results.

Minimal research has been done to see the impact of the acculturation gap on parents compared to adolescents. However, one study has found that there is a link between Hispanic adults that have low acculturation rates and an increased risk of poor low-density lipoprotein cholesterol control.

Confounding variables in studies 
Confounding variables (such as income and stability) exist in evaluations that connect the acculturation gap and family conflict. Therefore, the acculturation gap hypothesis needs further testing.

Furthermore, migration and work add to family stresses. Immigrants parents in the United States typically have longer work days and are away from their children more. These details must be addressed in future studies.

Future acculturation gap research 
Understanding the acculturation gap is important because minority population in the US continues to grow. Further research regarding the connection of acculturation gaps to family conflict could produce methods of to prevent conflict and treat those affected.

References 

Immigration
Cultural assimilation
Cultural studies
Families
Majority–minority relations